Solid Patels is a 2015 Bollywood Hindi comedy film directed by Saurabh Varma and produced by Nitika thakur. The film stars Shiv Panditt,  Kettan Singh, Shazahn Padamsee, Vaishali Desai, and Ali Asgar. The film was slated to release on 22 May 2015. The first look of the film  was released on 18 December 2014 and the trailer was launched on 18 March 2015.

Plot
Tom Patel and Jerry Patel. These Patel boys are no less than real life animated characters themselves. They live together in a rented apartment in Mumbai, and have no specific jobs. Both are mostly direction-less, and their only hope in life is optimism. Tom (Shiv Panditt) owes Ranchod (Varun Badola) some money, and his daughter happens to be Tom's girlfriend Hetal Gandhi (Shazahn Padamsee). The quirky Ranchod disapproves of Tom and gives him an ultimatum to return his money in two weeks. Jerry's (Kettan Singh) big problem in life is a nagging girlfriend Aliya Desai (Vaishali Desai) who constantly pesters him to marry her. In a situation like this, Tom comes up with a ridiculous, obnoxious and shocking 'Get-Rich-Quick' scheme. Unfortunately, the plan goes totally wrong, and his girlfriend also finds out about it. She gets furious and threatens to break up with him. On the other hand, Ranchod totally loses it and demands his money, come what may. This is when Tom comes up with yet another mind boggling plan to make money, in a snap. Both the boys swindle Ramneek Patel (Manoj Joshi), a rich innocent Gujrati NRI who has been in love with Jerry's bua Rita (Kitu Gidwani), since ages. Not only does Ramneek agree to send the money, but also comes all the way to India landing up at the Patel's residence to meet her. But where is Bua Rita??? Nobody knows - Thus embarking more madness, more laughter, laced with high points of emotional ups and downs - basically, in short, the craziest roller-coaster ride ever.

Cast
 Shiv Panditt as Tom Patel 
 Kettan Singh as Jerry Patel
 Shazahn Padamsee as Hetal Joshi 
 Vaishali Desai as Aliya Desai
 Ali Asgar as Dr. Thanawala 
 Manoj Joshi as Ramneek Patel
 Kitu Gidwani as Rita Patel
 Varun Badola as Hetal's father
 Snehal Dabi as Goon

References

External links
 

2015 films
Indian comedy films
2010s Hindi-language films
2015 comedy films
Hindi-language comedy films